Nisiturris obliquastructionis is a species of sea snail, a marine gastropod mollusc in the family Pyramidellidae, the pyrams and their allies.

Description
The length of the shell varies between 1.3 mm and 3.1 mm.

Distribution
This species occurs in the Pacific Ocean off the Solomons, Vanuatu, and Fiji.

References

 Robba E. (2013) Tertiary and Quaternary fossil pyramidelloidean gastropods of Indonesia. Scripta Geologica 144: 1-191.

External links
 To Encyclopedia of Life
 To World Register of Marine Species

Pyramidellidae
Gastropods described in 2010